Judith Paulette "Judi" Guthertz is a Guamanian educator and former politician. A member of the Democratic Party, Guthertz served as senator in the Guam Legislature for three consecutive terms.

Early life
Judith Guthertz was raised on Guam by her parents, Harry and Josette Guthertz. Guthertz attending public and private schools and graduating from the Academy of Our Lady of Guam.
Guthertz earned her Doctor of Public Administration degree from the University of the Philippines.

Guam Constitutional Convention of 1977
A special election was held on April 16, 1977, at which Guthertz was elected to the Constitutional Convention. The Convention was convened on May 4, 1977 and by December 15, 1977, the delegates signed the draft constitution. The draft constitution was rejected in the 1979 referendum.

Career
Guthertz served as Director of Public Safety and acting Chief of Police for three years.

Gurthertz worked at the University of Guam as a tenured Professor of Public Administration and Legal Studies at the School of Business and Public Administration for 28 years. Guthertz has served as Chair of the Public Administration and Legal Studies. Gurthertz served as Vice President of Academic Affairs at the University of Guam from April 1997 through January 2001, and was appointed acting President by the Board of Regents from August to December 2000.

Since the end of her terms in the Guam Legislature, Guthertz has been a classroom teacher in the Guam Department of Education.

Guam Legislature

Electoral history

References

21st-century American politicians
21st-century American women politicians
Guamanian Democrats
Guamanian police officers
Guamanian women in politics
Living people
Members of the Legislature of Guam
Year of birth missing (living people)